The blue-banded wrasse (Xiphocheilus typus) is a species of wrasse native to the easternmost Indian Ocean and the western Pacific Ocean. It is of minor importance to local commercial fisheries. This species is the only known member of its genus.

References

Fish of Thailand
Labridae
Fish described in 1856
Taxa named by Pieter Bleeker